Hildegard von Bingen: Celestial Hierarchy is a studio album by German musical group Sequentia. It was released in May 2013 under Deutsche Harmonia Mundi.

Track listing

References

External links
Sequentia - Hildegard von Bingen: Celestial Hierarchy

2013 albums
2013 classical albums
Hildegard of Bingen